Galu (also Romanized as Galū) is a village in Melkari Rural District, Vazineh District, Sardasht County, West Azerbaijan Province, Iran. At the 2006 census, its population was 89, in 16 families.

References 

Populated places in Sardasht County